Oliver Joseph Price (born 12 June 2001) is an English cricketer. He is the younger brother of fellow cricketer Tom Price. He was educated at Magdalen College School in Oxford before attending Durham University. He made his debut aged 17 for Oxfordshire in the minor counties competition. He made his first-class debut on 5 July 2021, for Gloucestershire in the 2021 County Championship. He made his List A debut on 12 August 2021, for Gloucestershire in the 2021 Royal London One-Day Cup. He made his Twenty20 debut on 29 May 2022, for Gloucestershire against the Sri Lanka Cricket Development XI during their tour of England.

References

External links
 

2001 births
Living people
English cricketers
Gloucestershire cricketers
Cricketers from Oxford
Oxfordshire cricketers
Alumni of Durham University